Aguilafuente is a municipality located in the province of Segovia, Castile and León, Spain. According to the 2004 census (INE), the municipality had a population of 773 inhabitants.

References

See also 
 List of municipalities in Segovia

Municipalities in the Province of Segovia